The Crocodile Hunter is a wildlife documentary television series hosted by Steve Irwin and his wife, Terri. The show became a popular franchise due to Irwin's unconventional approach to wildlife. It spawned a number of separate projects, including the feature film The Crocodile Hunter: Collision Course and two television spinoffs: Croc Files and The Crocodile Hunter Diaries.

The series was presented on Animal Planet, becoming the network's highest-rated series at the time, and was in international syndication on networks worldwide. The series aired 64 episodes during five seasons, from 1997 to 2004, two years before Irwin’s death, with a pilot episode in 1996 and 13 specials into 2007.

With a nearly 11-year run, the series is the second longest-running program of any Discovery Communications network, behind MythBusters.

Episodes

See also
List of programs broadcast by Animal Planet
 Australia Zoo
 Alby Mangels
 Crocodile Safari Man

References

External links
 
 Australia Zoo's Crocodile Hunter website
 Animal Planet - Crocodile Hunter program home page
 NEWS.com.au - In Depth on Steve Irwin's Life and Work
 REPTILES magazine Herp Expert Steve Irwin
 

1996 American television series debuts
1996 Australian television series debuts
2007 American television series endings
2007 Australian television series endings
1990s American documentary television series
2000s American documentary television series
1990s Australian documentary television series
2000s Australian documentary television series
Animal Planet original programming
Discovery Channel original programming
English-language television shows
Nature educational television series
Network 10 original programming
Steve Irwin
Television series about reptiles and amphibians
Television series by MGM Television
Television shows set in Queensland